is a Japanese television drama series and the 107th Asadora series, following Chimudondon. It premiered on October 3, 2022. Haruka Fukuhara was cast in the lead role of Mai Iwakura after an audition of 2545 women.

Plot

Cast

Iwakura family 

 Haruka Fukuhara as Mai Iwakura
 Haro Asano as young Mai
 Katsunori Takahashi as Kōta Iwakura, Mai's father
 Hiromi Nagasaku as Megumi iwakura, Mai's mother
 You Yokoyama as Haruto Iwakura, Mai's brother
 Saion Ebizuka as young Haruto
 Atsuko Takahata as Shōko Saitsu, Mai's grandmother and Megumi's mother

Mai's childhood friends 

 Eiji Akaso as Takashi Umezu, Okonomiyaki restaurant "Umezu" owner's son
 Kento Saitō as young Takashi
 Mizuki Yamashita as Kurumi Mochizuki, Mai's classmate
 Saki Ōno as young Kurumi

Higashiosaka people 

 Tomomitsu Yamaguchi as Masaru Umezu, Okonomiyaki restaurant "Umezu" owner, Takashi's father
 Rie Kawabata as Yukino Umezu, Okonomiyaki restaurant "Umezu" landlady, Takashi's mother
 Kanji Furutachi as Hisayuki Kasamaki, a worker at the factory run by Kōta
 Naoki Matayoshi as Iwao Yagi, the owner of second-hand bookstore "Derashine"
 Satoru Matsuo as Yoshiharu Mochizuki, Kurumi's father and former rugby player
 Seiko Takuma as Michiko Tsuda, a hostess of the café where Mai and Kurumi are working part-time

Goto Peninsula people 

 Show Aikawa as Gō Kido, a shipwright
 Kosuke Suzuki as Shingo Ura, an office staff
 Neru Nagahama as Sakura Yamanaka, a woman selling jam made by Sachiko at the shop

Naniwa Birdman seniors 

 Mahiro Takasugi as Hirofumi Kariya, 3rd year university student who is in charge of designing the human-powered aircraft "Swan"
 Ayako Yoshitani as Fūko Yura, 2nd year university student who is a pilot of the human-powered aircraft "Swan"
 Suguru Adachi as Aoi Tsuruta, 3rd year university student who is a circle representative

Aviation school people 

 Ren Meguro as Hiroaki Kashiwagi, an elite who grew up in an aviation family
 Hirona Yamazaki as Rinko Yano, a returnee who worked at a trading company
 Shogo Hama as Shinichi Nakazawa, a man who quit his job because he could not give up on his dream of becoming a pilot
 Kotarō Daigo as Taisei Yoshida, a man who goes to school on a scholarship
 Hiroki Sano as Yūki Mizushima, Mizushima Store president's son
 Kōji Kikkawa as Mamoru Ōkōchi, an aviation instructor

TV schedule

References

External links 

 Official website

2022 Japanese television series debuts
Asadora